Richard Smith (born 18 June 1973) is a former professional rugby league footballer who played in the 1990s and 2000s.

International honours
Richard Smith won caps for Ireland while at Bradford Northern, Hull Kingston Rovers and Wakefield Trinity 1995…2001 8-caps.

References

External links
Halifax Put Richard Smith On Transfer List
Lively Prescott prompts Hull revival
Great Britain Rugby All Stars Squad
Wildcats overpower Tigers
2001 Super League Team-by-team guide

1973 births
Living people
Bradford Bulls players
English people of Irish descent
English rugby league players
Featherstone Rovers players
Halifax R.L.F.C. players
Hull Kingston Rovers players
Ireland national rugby league team players
Keighley Cougars players
Place of birth missing (living people)
Rugby league centres
Rugby league fullbacks
Rugby league wingers
Salford Red Devils players
Wakefield Trinity players